Brise, Brisé or Briše may refer to:

Brisé (dance), a type of jump in ballet
"Brisé" (song), Maître Gims 2015
Brisé (music), Style brisé (French: "broken style"), Baroque music

Places
Briše, Kamnik, Slovenia
Briše pri Polhovem Gradcu
Briše, Zagorje ob Savi

People
 Ruggles-Brise, a surname
Ruggles-Brise baronets, Essex
Ronald Brisé (born 1974)
Cornelis Brisé (1622–1670), Dutch Golden Age painter
Tony Brise (1952–1975), English racing driver

See also
Brise soleil ("sun break"), an architectural feature
Brise-Glace (French "ice-breaker", as in the type of boat), 1990s instrumental avant-rock "supergroup"
Jolie Brise, ship 1913